Solendovirus is a genus of viruses, in the family Caulimoviridae order Ortervirales. Plants serve as natural hosts. There are two species in this genus. Diseases associated with this genus include: TVCV: vein-clearing symptoms in N. edwardsonii.

Taxonomy
The genus contains the following species:
Sweet potato vein clearing virus
Tobacco vein clearing virus

Structure
Viruses in Solendovirus are non-enveloped, with icosahedral geometries, and T=7 symmetry. The diameter is around 50 nm. Genomes are circular and non-segmented, around 7.7kb in length. The genome has 3 open reading frames.

Life cycle
Viral replication is nuclear/cytoplasmic. Replication follows the dsDNA(RT) replication model. dsDNA(RT) transcription is the method of transcription. The virus exits the host cell by nuclear pore export, and tubule-guided viral movement. Plants serve as the natural host. Transmission routes are seed borne.

References

External links
 Viralzone: Solendovirus
 ICTV

Caulimoviridae
Virus genera